Anjaneyulu is a 2009 Indian Telugu-language action comedy film starring Ravi Teja and Nayantara, while Sonu Sood plays a pivotal role. Directed by Parasuram, the music was composed by S.S. Thaman, produced by Bandla Ganesh, the film was released on 14 August 2009. The Tamil dubbed version titled Adhiradi Arjun was released in Chennai on 29 July 2016.

Plot
Employed with HMTV, Anjaneyulu lives in Hyderabad and is in constant touch with his retired father Krishnamurthy and mother. His boss Sudarshan Babu hires a creative consultant, Prabhakar. Their TV channel undergoes a number of changes, and Anjaneyulu gets to interview various people. He meets with Anjali, an Airtel employee, and both dramatically fall in love. While investigating corrupt politicians, he comes across evidence and decides to join the gang of a gangster named Bada. Still involved in gathering evidence, his world will come crashing around him when he will be told his parents and many others have been killed after their bus was torched by hooligans. He sets out to trace who was responsible behind their killing - not knowing that his life is also in danger.

Cast

Soundtrack
The music was composed by S. Thaman and released by Aditya Music. The song "Rajulakey Raraju" is based on the song "Uchimeedhu" from the Tamil film Sindhanai Sei, which was composed by Thaman.

Reception
Rediff has given an average rating of 2.5 out of 5 and described it as "Filled with masala, Anjaneyulu which is fairly slickly made is likely to go down well with the masses. Ravi Teja steals the show in Anjaneyulu". Idlebrain gave 3/5 rating for this film.

References

External links

2009 films
2009 action comedy films
2000s Telugu-language films
Films scored by Thaman S
Indian action comedy films
2009 comedy films
Films directed by Parasuram